Hans Karl Wilhelm Max Heinrich Sellschopp (16 April 1891, in Schwerin –  5 August 1978 in Bottighofen) was a German businessman and Nazi cultural officer at the Reichsmusikkammer, who worked as a concert promoter at Coventry Cathedral after World War II. He was later made Grand Commander of the Order of the Crown of Italy.

References

1891 births
1978 deaths
Businesspeople from Mecklenburg-Western Pomerania
Nazis
People from Schwerin